Yohei Nanbu  (born December 22, 1976) is a Japanese mixed martial artist. He competed in the Featherweight division.

Mixed martial arts record

|-
| Loss
| align=center| 2-7-2
| Hatsu Hioki
| Decision (Unanimous)
| Shooto: Gig Central 5
| 
| align=center| 2
| align=center| 5:00
| Nagoya, Aichi, Japan
| 
|-
| Loss
| align=center| 2-6-2
| Akitoshi Tamura
| Decision (Unanimous)
| Shooto: Wanna Shooto 2003
| 
| align=center| 2
| align=center| 5:00
| Tokyo, Japan
| 
|-
| Loss
| align=center| 2-5-2
| Jin Kazeta
| TKO (Knee and Punches)
| Shooto: 2/6 in Kitazawa Town Hall
| 
| align=center| 1
| align=center| 3:30
| Setagaya, Tokyo, Japan
| 
|-
| Loss
| align=center| 2-4-2
| Makoto Ishikawa
| Decision (Majority)
| Shooto: Treasure Hunt 5
| 
| align=center| 2
| align=center| 5:00
| Tokyo, Japan
| 
|-
| Loss
| align=center| 2-3-2
| Takaharu Murahama
| Decision (Unanimous)
| Shooto: To The Top 1
| 
| align=center| 2
| align=center| 5:00
| Tokyo, Japan
| 
|-
| Draw
| align=center| 2-2-2
| Takumi Nakayama
| Draw
| Shooto: R.E.A.D. 12
| 
| align=center| 2
| align=center| 5:00
| Tokyo, Japan
| 
|-
| Loss
| align=center| 2-2-1
| Kohei Yasumi
| Decision (Majority)
| Shooto: R.E.A.D. 1
| 
| align=center| 2
| align=center| 5:00
| Tokyo, Japan
| 
|-
| Win
| align=center| 2-1-1
| Yohei Suzuki
| Decision (Unanimous)
| Shooto: Shooter's Ambition
| 
| align=center| 2
| align=center| 5:00
| Setagaya, Tokyo, Japan
| 
|-
| Win
| align=center| 1-1-1
| Koichi Tanaka
| Decision (Majority)
| Shooto: Renaxis 3
| 
| align=center| 2
| align=center| 5:00
| Setagaya, Tokyo, Japan
| 
|-
| Draw
| align=center| 0-1-1
| Hiromichi Maruyama
| Draw
| Shooto: Shooter's Passion
| 
| align=center| 2
| align=center| 5:00
| Setagaya, Tokyo, Japan
| 
|-
| Loss
| align=center| 0-1
| Kazuya Abe
| Decision (Unanimous)
| Shooto: Shooter's Soul
| 
| align=center| 2
| align=center| 5:00
| Setagaya, Tokyo, Japan
|

See also
List of male mixed martial artists

References

1976 births
Japanese male mixed martial artists
Featherweight mixed martial artists
Living people